Ado Roosiorg (3 October 1887 Tarvastu Parish, Viljandi County – 15 August 1942 Karaganda Oblast) was an Estonian politician. He was a member of VI Riigikogu (its Chamber of Deputies).

References

1887 births
1942 deaths
Members of the Riigivolikogu